The women's 100 metre backstroke event at the 2015 European Games in Baku took place on 26 and 27 June at the Aquatic Palace.

Results

Heats
The heats were started on 26 June at 09:51.

Semifinals
The semifinals were started on 26 June at 17:44.

Semifinal 1

Semifinal 2

Final
The final was held on 27 June at 17:52.

References

Women's 100 metre backstroke
2015 in women's swimming